Mark These Words is the seventh studio album by Bulgarian metal band Odd Crew, released on 9 October 2015.

Promotion and release 
On 27 December 2014 the band started a crowd-funding campaign on IndieGogo and announced that they're preparing to record their upcoming album Mark These Words. The plan was to record the album with the American producer Jason Suecof at his studio in Florida, USA. When they reached 20% of the money for the campaign they released a demo track from the album called "Lay On Me" and 3 weeks later an acoustic version of the song. Shortly after that though the American embassy declined to give them visas for the project in the US and the band decided to record the album with Swedish producer Daniel Bergstrand in Dugout Studios' (Uppsala, Sweden) and then send the tracks to Jason Suecof for mixing at AudioHammer Studios, Sanford, Florida. The mastering duty was given to Alan Douches at West West Side Music, New Windsor, New York. The campaign was set to end on 18 February and shortly after that the band started the recording process. Through the campaign they managed to sell over 300 copies of the album in advance.

Touring 
Odd Crew have announced they will be touring Bulgaria in support of Mark These Words. If you're interested in dates outside Bulgaria, check their Facebook page.

Track listing

Personnel 
Odd Crew
 Vasil Raykov – vocals
 Vassil Parvanovski – guitar
 Martin Stoyanov – bass
 Boyan 'Bonzy' Georgiev – drums

References

External links 
 
 https://web.archive.org/web/20151014102859/http://oddcrew.net/

2015 albums